James J. "Jumbo" Davis (September 5, 1861 – February 14, 1921) was a  Major League Baseball third baseman. He played all or part of seven seasons in the majors, between 1884 and 1891, for the Brooklyn Gladiators, St. Louis Browns, Baltimore Orioles, Washington Statesmen, and two different Kansas City Cowboys teams, one in the Union Association and the other in the American Association.

See also

 List of Major League Baseball annual triples leaders
 List of Major League Baseball players to hit for the cycle

External links
, or Retrosheet
 

1861 births
1921 deaths
Major League Baseball third basemen
Baseball players from New York (state)
19th-century baseball players
Kansas City Cowboys (UA) players
Kansas City Cowboys players
Baltimore Orioles (AA) players
Washington Statesmen players
St. Louis Browns (AA) players
Brooklyn Gladiators players
Quincy Quincys players
Bay City (minor league baseball) players
Brockton (minor league baseball) players
Burials at Calvary Cemetery (St. Louis)